This is a list of Civil War regiments from Maryland which fought in the Union Army. The list of Maryland Confederate Civil War units is shown separately.

Infantry
1st Regiment Maryland Volunteer Infantry
1st Maryland Infantry, Potomac Home Brigade 
1st Regiment Eastern Shore Maryland Volunteer Infantry
2nd Regiment Maryland Volunteer Infantry
2nd Regiment Maryland Eastern Shore Infantry 
2nd Maryland Infantry, Potomac Home Brigade
3rd Regiment Maryland Volunteer Infantry
3rd Maryland Infantry, Potomac Home Brigade 
4th Regiment Maryland Volunteer Infantry
4th Regiment Potomac Home Brigade Infantry 
5th Regiment Maryland Volunteer Infantry
6th Regiment Maryland Volunteer Infantry
7th Regiment Maryland Volunteer Infantry
8th Regiment Maryland Volunteer Infantry
9th Regiment Maryland Volunteer Infantry
10th Regiment Maryland Volunteer Infantry
11th Regiment Maryland Volunteer Infantry
12th Regiment Maryland Volunteer Infantry
13th Regiment Maryland Volunteer Infantry
19th Regiment Maryland Volunteer Infantry
Purnell Legion Infantry
Baltimore Light Guard Infantry 
Patapsco Guard
Litton's regiment of Maryland infantry

Cavalry
1st Regiment Maryland Volunteer Cavalry
2nd Regiment Maryland Volunteer Cavalry
3rd Regiment Maryland Volunteer Cavalry - Bradford Dragoons
1st Regiment Potomac Home Brigade - Cole's
Purnell Legion Maryland Volunteer Cavalry
Smith's Independent Company Maryland Volunteer Cavalry

Artillery
1st Regiment Maryland Heavy Artillery
Battery A, Maryland Light Artillery [Rigby's Battery]
Battery "A" Junior Maryland Light Artillery 
Snow's Battery "B" Maryland Light Artillery 
Battery "B" Junior Maryland Light Artillery 
Battery "D" Maryland Light Artillery 
Baltimore Independent Battery Light Artillery

References
The Civil War Archive

See also
Lists of American Civil War Regiments by State

 
Maryland
Civil War